Black Drops is an album by organist Charles Earland which was recorded in 1970 and released on the Prestige label.

Reception

Alex Henderson of Allmusic wrote, "Although not in a class with Black Talk or Living Black, this Bob Porter-produced soul-jazz/hard bop LP is satisfying and generally enjoyable".

Track listing 
All compositions by Charles Earland except where noted.
 "Sing a Simple Song" (Sylvester Stewart) – 5:44  
 "Don't Say Goodbye" – 7:09  
 "Lazy Bird" (John Coltrane) – 7:18  
 "Letha" – 7:23  
 "Raindrops Keep Falling on My Head" (Burt Bacharach, Hal David) – 3:48  
 "Buck Green" – 7:17

Personnel 
Charles Earland – organ
Virgil Jones – trumpet
Clayton Pruden – trombone
Jimmy Heath – tenor saxophone, soprano saxophone, flute
Maynard Parker – guitar
Jimmy Turner – drums

References 

Charles Earland albums
1970 albums
Prestige Records albums
Albums recorded at Van Gelder Studio
Albums produced by Bob Porter (record producer)